Hoxie is a city in and the county seat of Sheridan County, Kansas, United States.  As of the 2020 census, the population of the city was 1,211.

History
Hoxie was laid out in early 1886.  The town founders convinced the residents of Kenneth, a community three miles to the north and the current county seat, to move south (including their buildings) at their expense to the new site of Hoxie.  The residents of Kenneth knew the coming rail line would pass through Hoxie and not their town as they had hoped, so the offer was promising.  The towns agreed to consolidate and carry out that plan, making Hoxie the new county seat. It was named for H.M. Hoxie, a railroad official.  The railroad (which became part of the Union Pacific Railroad) arrived in 1888.

The 99-mile Plainville-Colby branch of the Union Pacific railroad which passed through Hoxie was abandoned in 1998.

Geography
Hoxie is located at  (39.354329, -100.439952).

Climate
The climate in this area is characterized by hot, humid summers and generally mild to cool winters.  According to the Köppen Climate Classification system, Hoxie has a humid subtropical climate, abbreviated "Cfa" on climate maps.

Demographics

2010 census
As of the census of 2010, there were 1,201 people, 546 households, and 341 families residing in the city. The racial makeup of the city was 96.5% White, 0.1% Native American, 0.3% Asian, 1.4% from other races, and 1.7% from two or more races. Hispanic or Latino of any race were 3.6% of the population.

There were 546 households, of which 24.5% had children under the age of 18 living with them, 50.9% were married couples living together, 6.6% had a female householder with no husband present, 4.9% had a male householder with no wife present, and 37.5% were non-families. 34.8% of all households were made up of individuals, and 19.6% had someone living alone who was 65 years of age or older. The average household size was 2.14 and the average family size was 2.72.

The median age in the city was 48.9 years. 21.4% of residents were under the age of 18; 5.4% were between the ages of 18 and 24; 17.9% were from 25 to 44; 28.2% were from 45 to 64; and 27.1% were 65 years of age or older. The gender makeup of the city was 48.4% male and 51.6% female.

2000 census
As of the census of 2000, there were 1,244 people, 543 households, and 350 families residing in the city. The racial makeup of the city was 98.79% White, 0.16% African American, 0.16% Native American, 0.08% Asian, 0.48% from other races, and 0.32% from two or more races. Hispanic or Latino of any race were 1.37% of the population.

There were 543 households, out of which 25.6% had children under the age of 18 living with them, 56.2% were married couples living together, 6.6% had a female householder with no husband present, and 35.4% were non-families. 33.5% of all households were made up of individuals, and 20.4% had someone living alone who was 65 years of age or older. The average household size was 2.21 and the average family size was 2.81.

In the city, the population was spread in with 21.7% under the age of 18, 6.3% from 18 to 24, 21.2% from 25 to 44, 25.0% from 45 to 64, and 25.8% who were 65 years of age or older. The median age was 45 years. For every 100 females, there were 89.1 males. For every 100 females age 18 and over, there were 82.4 males.

The median income for a household in the city was $33,810, and the median income for a family was $41,641. Males had a median income of $28,235 versus $15,804 for females. The per capita income for the city was $17,286. About 10.7% of families and 13.9% of the population were below the poverty line, including 25.7% of those under age 18 and 7.5% of those age 65 or over.

Education
The community is served by Hoxie USD 412 public school district which includes Hoxie Junior-Senior High School and Hoxie Elmentary School.

Media
The Hoxie Sentinel was founded in 1884 as the Weekly Sentinel in the community of Kenneth, and was generally titled as The Hoxie Sentinel from 1886 to 2016. Hoxie's one weekly newspaper is now titled The Sheridan Sentinel after it was renamed when The Hoxie Sentinel changed owners in 2016.

Notable people
 Les Barnhart, Major League Baseball player 
 Nick Hague, NASA astronaut
 Jacie Hoyt, Oklahoma State University Women's Basketball Head Coach 
 Dirk Johnson, professional football player, NFL
 Brad Lambert, Head Coach, Charlotte 49ers (Collegiate football)
 Urbane Pickering, Major League Baseball player
 Gordon Sloan, associate justice of the Oregon Supreme Court
 Erastus Turner, U.S. Representative from Kansas

References

Further reading

External links
 City of Hoxie
 Hoxie - Directory of Public Officials
 Sheridan County Historical Society & Mickey’s Museum
 Hoxie city map, KDOT

Cities in Kansas
County seats in Kansas
Cities in Sheridan County, Kansas